Bryan Philip Jordan (born September 13, 1985 in Pasadena, California) is an American former soccer player.

Career

Youth and college
Jordan graduated from Temple City High School in Temple City, California (the same school as US men’s national team veteran Jimmy Conrad) in 2003, having registered 46 goals and 28 assists in his career, and set the school record for goals with 22 in his senior year.

At Oregon State University, Jordan was an invaluable member of the Beavers' strike force, appearing in over 50 games since 2003, and being named to the Pac-10 All-Academic first team in both 2004 and 2005.

Professional
During his college years Jordan played for the San Fernando Valley Quakes in the USL Premier Development League, before being picked up by Portland Timbers of the USL First Division prior to their 2007 campaign. Jordan scored five goals in 26 appearances for the Timbers, helping them to the semi-finals of the USL-1 playoffs.

Jordan had been on trial with Los Angeles Galaxy during the club's pre-season, featuring in the inaugural Pan-Pacific Championship in Hawaii, and featuring on their Asian tour in China and Hong Kong. Having impressed Galaxy coach Ruud Gullit with his performances, Jordan signed a full professional contract with Galaxy on March 26, 2008.

He made his MLS debut on May 10, 2008, coming on as an 83rd-minute substitute for Joe Franchino in Galaxy's 2-1 loss to the New York Red Bulls, and made his first start (and scored his first goal) on 6 September 2008, against Real Salt Lake. Also during 2008 Jordan was loaned out to the Portland Timbers of the USL First Division for part of the season.

Jordan remained with Galaxy from 2008 and signed a new contract with the club on December 23, 2011.

At the end of the 2012 season, Los Angeles declined its 2013 contract option on Jordan and he chose to enter the 2012 MLS Re-Entry Draft. On December 14, 2012, Jordan was selected by San Jose Earthquakes in stage two of the draft.

In August 2013 Jordan signed with the German club BSV Schwarz-Weiß Rehden.

International
Jordan made one appearance for the United States U-23 national team in a Toulon Tournament match against Ivory Coast.

Honors

Los Angeles Galaxy
MLS Cup (2): 2011, 2012
Major League Soccer Supporters' Shield (2): 2010, 2011

References

External links

 

1985 births
Living people
American soccer players
Oregon State Beavers men's soccer players
San Fernando Valley Quakes players
Portland Timbers (2001–2010) players
LA Galaxy players
San Antonio Scorpions players
Sportspeople from Pasadena, California
USL League Two players
USL First Division players
Major League Soccer players
North American Soccer League players
United States men's under-23 international soccer players
Association football utility players
Association football fullbacks
Association football wingers
Association football forwards